Preble Township is one of twelve townships in Adams County, Indiana. As of the 2010 census, its population was 1,069.

Geography

Unincorporated towns
 Magley
 Preble

Adjacent townships

 Washington Township (southeast)
 Kirkland Township

Cemeteries
The township contains the following cemeteries: Fuhrman (abandoned), Magley (also known as Salem or UCC), Mann, St. John Lutheran (Bingen), St. Paul Lutheran, and Zion Lutheran (Friedheim).

Major highways

Rivers
 Saint Mary's River

School districts
 North Adams Community Schools

Political districts
 Indiana's 6th congressional district
 State House District 79
 State Senate District 19

References
 
 United States Census Bureau 2007 TIGER/Line Shapefiles
 United States National Atlas

External links
 Indiana Township Association
 United Township Association of Indiana

Townships in Adams County, Indiana
Townships in Indiana